Daniel Andrés Ríos (born 21 February 1983) is an Argentine football striker. He currently plays with Club América.

Career
Ríos started his football career in Universitario de Córdoba in 2002, later being transferred to Belgrano in 2003.  He appeared in 20 Argentine Primera División matches during 2006 and 2007, scoring 6 goals.

He later was purchased by Mexican Primera División Tiburones Rojos de Veracruz where he scored 5 goals in 12 matches in the 2007 Apertura, but failed to complete the season due to an injury suffered during a tackle by Felipe Baloy that kept him out for 2 seasons. For the 2008 Apertura he was purchased by Toluca, but only made 5 appearances before once again suffering an injury that kept him out until the 2009 Clausura. He played for Atlas on loan during the 2009-10 season.

On 26 December 2009 Colón de Santa Fe signed the Argentine forward from Veracruz on a 50% joint ownership deal until 2012. However, in 2010 he returned to Belgrano to fight for promotion in the Argentine second division.

References

External links
 Argentine Primera statistics  
 
 

1983 births
Living people
Footballers from Córdoba, Argentina
Argentine footballers
Argentine expatriate footballers
Club Atlético Belgrano footballers
Club Atlético Colón footballers
Club América footballers
Liga MX players
Argentine Primera División players
Deportivo Toluca F.C. players
C.D. Veracruz footballers
Atlas F.C. footballers
Expatriate footballers in Mexico
Argentine expatriate sportspeople in Mexico
Association football forwards